Trying is a British comedy television series created by Andy Wolton. The first season premiered on 1 May 2020 on Apple TV+. The second season premiered on 21 May 2021, and the third season premiered on 22 July 2022. In August 2022, Apple announced the show was to be renewed for a fourth season.

Premise 
The series follows Nikki and Jason, a couple who really want to become parents but who struggle with conceiving a child. In order to have the baby they want they decide to adopt, only to face a whole list of new challenges and surprises that come with the adoption process.

Cast 
 Esther Smith as Nikki Newman
 Rafe Spall as Jason Ross
 Imelda Staunton as Penny
 Ophelia Lovibond as Erica
 Oliver Chris as Freddy - Jason's best mate from uni
 Sian Brooke as Karen - Nikki's sister
 Darren Boyd as Scott
 Robyn Cara as Jennifer/Jen
 Phil Davis as Vic
 Paula Wilcox as Sandra
 Marian McLoughlin as Jilly
 Roderick Smith as John
 Diana Pozharskaya as Sofia - a student who Jason teaches
 Cush Jumbo as Jane
 Navin Chowdhry as Deven

Episodes

Season 1 (2020)

Season 2 (2021)

Season 3 (2022)

Production

Development 
On 12 July 2019, it was reported that Apple Inc. and the BBC were working together for a new comedy series with the working title Alabama. Production on the series was already underway with the series set to be released sometime in 2020. Trying is the second co-production between Apple and the BBC after a reboot Prehistoric Planet was announced two months prior. On 19 January 2020, Apple Inc. formally announced the series in a press release with the official title Trying.

On 1 May 2020, Esther Smith confirmed in an interview with Metro that a second season had been commissioned by Apple.

With the announcement of a 14 May 2021 second season release date, Apple also renewed the show for a third season.

Casting 
Alongside the initial report of the series in July 2019, it was announced that Imelda Staunton would star in the series. In the press release of January 2020, Apple announced that Rafe Spall and Esther Smith would star in the series.

Reception

Critical response 
On the review aggregator website Rotten Tomatoes, the first season 86% of 22 critics' reviews are positive, with an average rating of 7.3/10. For the second season, 100% of 13 critics' reviews are positive, with an average rating of 8.5/10. Metacritic, which uses a weighted average, assigned the film a score of 69 out of 100, based on eight critics, indicating "generally favorable reviews".

Accolades 
The song "Neck of the Woods" by Maisie Peters and Joe Rubel was nominated for Best Original Song in a TV Show/Limited Series by the Hollywood Music in Media Awards in 2021.

References

External links 

2020s American comedy television series
2020 American television series debuts
English-language television shows
Television series about families
2020s British comedy television series
2020 British television series debuts
Apple TV+ original programming
BBC television comedy
Television shows set in London
Television series about couples
Television series by BBC Studios
Television series about adoption